The 2012 Hawaii State House of Representatives Elections were held on November 6, 2012. All 51 seats were up for election.

A total of 6 (3 Democratic and 3 Republican) seats changed sides as a result of the election. 2 Republican incumbents failed to secure reelection against Democratic opponents. 3 Republicans took advantage of the redistricting and gained seats in districts vacated by incumbents. Democrats also took control of the District 19 seat vacated by retiring Republican Barbara Marumoto-Coons.

Retiring Incumbents
A total of 5 incumbents were retiring.

Incumbents Defeated in the Primary
Due to redistricting, two incumbents were forced to compete with each other for the same district. Democratic Representative Jessica Wooley (District 47) defeated Democratic Representative Pono Chong (District 49) for the Democratic nomination in District 48.

Republican Representative Gil Riviere lost his nomination to Richard Fale in the primary. He was the only incumbent to lose a primary.

Complete List

See also
Hawaii Senate elections, 2012
United States Senate election in Hawaii, 2012
United States House of Representatives elections in Hawaii, 2012

References 

House of Representatives
Hawaii House of Representatives elections
Hawaii House of Representatives